Strom may refer to:

Astronomy
8408 Strom (1995 SX12), a main-belt asteroid discovered on September 18, 1995 by Spacewatch at Kitt Peak

Geography
Strom, Virginia, an unincorporated community in Botetourt County, Virginia, United States
Strom (Ucker), a river of Brandenburg, Germany
Strom Glacier, a steep valley glacier flowing from the north side of Mount Fridtjof Nansen to the head of the Ross Ice Shelf
Strom Lake, a lake in Minnesota

Surname
Ström (surname)
Strøm, a surname

People
Allen Axel Strom (c.1914–1997), Australian environmental educator and naturalist
Brent Strom (born 1948), a former baseball player who played as a pitcher in Major League Baseball
Brock Strom (born 1934), a former American football player
David M. Strom (born 1957), American experimental particle physicist at the University of Oregon
David Strom (born 1964), Research Director at the Emmer for Governor Campaign
Earl Strom (1927–1994), American professional basketball referee
Harry Strom (1914–1984), the ninth Premier of Alberta, Canada, from 1968 to 1971
Jeff Strom, a footballer who represented New Zealand at international level
Karl Morin-Strom (born 1952), a former politician in Ontario, Canada
Kevin Alfred Strom (born 1956), American white nationalist activist
Lyle Elmer Strom (born 1925), a United States federal judge
Mark Strom (born 1982), a Mexican American professional basketball player
Rick Strom (American football), former American football player who played as a quarterback in the NFL
Rick Strom (music), American music producer
Stephanie Strom, American journalist, correspondent for The New York Times
Strom Thurmond (1902–2003), American politician
Virginia Strom-Martin (born 1948), American politician, served in the California state Assembly
Yale Strom, American Klezmer violinist, amateur ethnomusicologist, documentarist, and writer

Companies
Strom Products, an American food manufacturer in Bannockburn, Illinois
Verlag Der Strom, Christian publishing company located in Stuttgart, Germany

Music
"Strom" (song),  song by Die Toten Hosen from the album In aller Stille

Other
Ström Vodka, brand of vodka

See also
Die Stadt hinter dem Strom, a German language existentialist novel by Hermann Kasack, published in 1947 in Berlin
Die Stadt hinter dem Strom (opera), an oratorio-opera in three acts composed by Hans Vogt
Ein Strom fließt durch Deutschland, an East German film
J. Strom Thurmond Dam, a concrete-gravity and embankment dam at the border of South Carolina and Georgia, creating Lake Strom Thurmond
Lake Strom Thurmond, a reservoir at the border between Georgia and South Carolina in the Savannah River Basin
Suzuki V-Strom 1000, a dual-sport motorcycle with a 996 cc V-twin engine and a standard riding posture
Suzuki V-Strom 650, a mid-weight, dual-sport motorcycle with a standard riding posture, fuel injection and an aluminum chassis
Storm (disambiguation)